Kollangarai  is a village in the Thanjavur taluk of Thanjavur district, Tamil Nadu, India.

Demographics 

As per the 2001 census, Kollangarai Vallundanpattu had a total population of 1900 with  938 males and  962 females. The sex ratio was 1026. The literacy rate was 64.43.

References 

 

Villages in Thanjavur district